Cefonicide (or cefonicid) is a cephalosporin antibiotic.

It has a density of 1.92g/cm3.


Synthesis
Injectable semi-synthetic cephalosporin antibiotic related to cefamandole, q.v.

Cefonicid is synthesized conveniently by nucleophilic displacement of the 3-acetoxy moiety of 1 with the appropriately substituted tetrazole thiole 2. The mandelic acid amide C-7 side chain is reminiscent of cefamandole.

See also 
 Cefazaflur

References 

Acetaldehyde dehydrogenase inhibitors
Cephalosporin antibiotics
Enantiopure drugs
Phenylethanolamines
Sulfonic acids
Tetrazoles